Warrnambool (Maar: Peetoop or Wheringkernitch or Warrnambool) is a city on the south-western coast of Victoria, Australia. At the 2021 census, Warrnambool had a population of 35,743. Situated on the Princes Highway, Warrnambool (Allansford) marks the western end of the Great Ocean Road and the southern end of the Hopkins Highway.

History

Origin of name
The name "Warrnambool" originated from Mount Warrnambool, a scoria cone volcano 25 kilometres northeast of the town. Warrnambool (or Warrnoobul) was the title of both the volcano and the clan of Aboriginal Australian people who lived there. In the local language, the prefix Warnn- designated home or hut, while the meaning of the suffix -ambool is now unknown. William Fowler Pickering, the colonial government surveyor who in 1845 was tasked with the initial planning of the township, chose to name the town Warrnambool. The traditional Indigenous owners of the land today are the Dhauwurd Wurrung people, also known as the Gunditjmara.

Aboriginal Australians
Aboriginal Australians have been occupying the site of Warrnambool for at least the last 35,000 years. The vicinity around the Merri River was inhabited by people known as the Merrigundidj, part of the larger Gunditjmara nation. They spoke a language called Bi:gwurrung, which was a dialect of the Dhauwurd Wurrung language. These people constructed large stone and timber weirs called yereroc across various waterways in the region in order to facilitate the trapping of eels. The area at the mouth of the Hopkins River was known as Moyjil. At the beginning of British colonisation of the region in 1841, there were approximately 400 Aboriginal people living around the coastal parts of the Merri River including a number of Koroitgundidj people residing in a village at what is now known as Tower Hill. There are several Maar placenames for locations in the area including: 'Kunang' referring to a waterhole on present-day Koroit Street which was a celebrated place for kangaroos to drink, 'Wirkneung' referring to the site of Warrnambool cemetery, 'Puurkar' referring to the Western Hill area of Warrnambool, and 'Peetoop' which is one of the names for the area meaning 'small sandpiper'.

European maritime exploration
A popular legend is that the first Europeans to visit the region were Cristóvão de Mendonça and his crew who surveyed the coastline nearby and were marooned near the site of the present town as early as the 16th century, based on the unverified reports of local whalers' discovery of the wreck of a mahogany ship. The ship's provenance has been variously attributed to France, China, Spain and Portugal. There is no physical evidence to suggest that it ever existed.

The first documented European exploration of the area occurred under Lieutenant James Grant, a Scottish explorer who sailed the  along the coast in December 1800 and named several features. The area was frequented by whalers early in the 19th century.

British colonisation
British colonisation of the land in the region began in 1838 when Captain Alexander Campbell, a whaler based at nearby Port Fairy, took possession of 4,000 acres around the mouth of the Merri River. He set up a farm there and built his main hut where Warrnambool now stands. The township was planned and surveyed in 1845, with the first allotments being sold in 1847. A Post Office opened on 1 January 1849.

During the Victorian Gold Rush, Warrnambool became an important port and grew quickly in the 1850s, benefiting from the private ownership of nearby Port Fairy. It was gazetted as a municipality in 1855, and became a borough in 1863. Warrnambool was declared a town in 1883, and a city in 1918. Post Offices opened at Warrnambool South in 1937 (closed 1973), Warrnambool East in 1946, and Warrnambool North in 1947 (closed 1975).

Climate

Warrnambool has a mild Mediterranean climate (Csb) that closely borders the oceanic climate (Cfb), and is characterised by mild, dry, very swingy summers and cool, rainy winters with frequent cloud cover. Annual and especially winter rainfall is much higher than in Melbourne due to its westerly exposure.

Cityscape
The original City of Warrnambool was a 4x8 grid, with boundaries of Lava Street (north), Japan Street (east), Merri Street (south) and Henna Street (west). In the nineteenth century, it was intended that Fairy Street – with its proximity to the Warrnambool Railway Station – would be the main street of Warrnambool. However, Liebig Street has since become the main street of the central business district (CBD). The Warrnambool CBD is particularly notable for its number of roundabouts.

Outside the CBD, the Warrnambool Botanic Gardens feature wide curving paths, rare trees, a lily pond with ducks, a fernery, a band rotunda, and was designed by notable landscape architect, William Guilfoyle.

Eleven suburbs surround the CBD of Warrnambool: North, South, East and West Warrnambool, Brierly, Sherwood Park, Merrivale, Dennington, Woodford, Bushfield and Allansford, though only the four latter are recognised as localities of the city.

Culture

During the end of June and the start of July every year, Warrnambool is the home to the children's festival Fun4Kids. It is held next to the Lighthouse Theatre in the CBD.(last ran 2017 cancelled early 2018)

Wunta Fiesta, a festival held in Warrnambool over the first weekend of February annually, is one of south-west Victoria's major community festivals. It incorporates a wide range of entertainment (mostly music) for all ages.

The Flagstaff Hill Maritime Museum is in Warrnambool built on Flagstaff Hill that also holds the original lighthouses and Warrnambool Garrison. Its most prized item in its collection is the Minton peacock salvaged from the Loch Ard.
Flagstaff Hill Maritime Village is built around the original lighthouses and now operates as a heritage attraction and museum for the Great Ocean Road.  Winner of three Victorian Tourism Awards – Tourist Attraction, it houses an extensive collection of shipwreck and maritime trade artefacts in both a museum and village setting.

The Lady Bay Lighthouse complex is on the Victorian heritage register due to its significance as an example of early colonial development. There has been a flagstaff on top of Flagstaff Hill since 1848, and the current lighthouses were moved to the site in 1878. They still operate as navigation aids for the channel into Warrnambool harbour.

The Warrnambool foreshore is a popular swimming area, and is adjacent to the Lake Pertobe parklands. A number of caravan parks are also located in the area.

Baritone Robert Nicholson recorded the song Back to Warrnambool in 1924.

Warrnambool is the setting and filming location of the 2015 film Oddball, starring Shane Jacobson.

Media
Warrnambool is served by one daily newspaper, The Standard, which is owned by Australian Community Media. The local commercial radio stations are 94.5 3YB and 95.3 Coast FM, both owned by Ace Radio. There is also a community radio channel, 3WAY FM. The ABC also owns a radio station, ABC South West Victoria, which is based in Warrnambool.

Warrnambool is also served by local transmission of free-to-air television networks ABC, SBS, Prime7, Southern Cross and WIN.

Out of those networks, WIN Television produces the only local television news bulletin, WIN News, which uses resources from their Ballarat and Warrnambool newsrooms.

Sport

Warrnambool is home to the Grand Annual Sprintcar Classic, a race which attracts Australian and international drivers on the Australia Day long weekend, especially because of its position in the motorsport calendar.

The city is also the finishing point of the Melbourne to Warrnambool Classic cycle race. It is the longest one-day bicycle endurance race in the world, held every October since 1895 to be the world's second oldest bike race.

Warrnambool has a horse racing club, the Warrnambool Racing Club, which schedules around twenty race meetings a year including the Warrnambool Cup and Grand Annual Steeple three-day meeting in the first week of May. The Woodford Racing Club also holds one meeting at Warrnambool racecourse. The Grand Annual steeplechase has 33 jumps, more than any other horse race and is one of the longest steeplechases in the world.

The Warrnambool Greyhound Racing Club holds regular greyhound racing meetings on most Thursdays. The Greyhound version of the Warrnambool Cup is held on the first Wednesday of May.  The club also holds the Seaside Festival over the Christmas and New Year period providing great entertainment and value for money for both kids and kids at heart. The club is located centrally in the Warrnambool Showgrounds Precinct on Koroit Street and opened on 27 July 1978.

Warrnambool is home to the Premier Speedway, a  dirt track oval speedway located approximately 5 km east of the town. As well as hosting various Victorian state championships, Premier Speedway has hosted Australian championships for Sprintcars, Super Sedans and Street Stocks. Premier Speedway has also regularly hosted rounds of the World Series Sprintcars, being one of only five tracks to host a round of every series run since its inception in 1987. Since 1973 the speedway has been home to the Grand Annual Sprintcar Classic, the biggest single sprint car racing meeting in Australia, and on occasion has outdrawn the famed Knoxville Nationals in the United States for number of competitors entered, as better known drivers enter both races. The Classic is traditionally run the weekend before the national title meeting. The speedway has hosted the Classic / Australian Championship double on six occasions - 1979, 1986, 1994, 1999, 2003 and 2011, with Sydney's 10 time Australian Champion Garry Rush the only driver to win the double at Warrnambool in 1986 when he won his 6th Classic and a week later his 7th national title.

Gunditjmara Bulls and North Warrnambool Warriors play rugby league in NRL Victoria.

From 1 to 3 September 2008, the city hosted, along with Melbourne, the 2008 Australian Football International Cup, featuring 14 nations from around the world playing Australian rules football. The sport is highly popular in Warrnambool which has a competitive local league and is the origin of many high-profile AFL players. The city has three Australian Rules football teams playing in the Hampden Football League (North Warrnambool, South Warrnambool and Warrnambool), and many more in the Warrnambool District Football League

Golfers play either on the 18 hole course at the Warrnambool Golf Club a public access course ranked in Australia's top 100 courses, or at the 9 hole course at the Deakin University Warrnambool campus.(Deakin course not playable)

Economy 

Warrnambool attracts many visitors each year, and is a comprehensive regional service centre. The town's tourism benefits from the views from the Great Ocean Road, and its nearby beaches, some of which are used for surfing. In the winter months, Southern Right whales can be seen in the waters near the city at the Logan's Beach nursery, and boats make whale-watching tours. Visitor levels are usually higher during the winter school holidays due to Australia's Biggest Children's Festival, the Fun4Kids Festival.(now cancelled from 2018)
 

The mainstay of the economy is agriculture and its support industry – particularly dairy farming and associated milk processing. Other major industries and services include retail, education, health, meat processing, clothing manufacture and construction. The Fletcher Jones and Staff Pty Ltd clothing factory opened in 1948 and was closed in 2005.

Demographics

15.1% of Warrnambool residents were born outside Australia, which is significantly less than the Australian average of 33.1%. 89.1% speak only English at home and 2.0% are Indigenous.

Governance

The Local Government is the Warrnambool City Council.

At the state level, Warrnambool was within the electoral district of Warrnambool until it was abolished in 2002. Since then, Warrnambool has been in the South-West Coast electorate. This was held by former Premier Denis Napthine of the Liberal Party until his retirement in 2015, the resulting by-election electing Roma Britnell, also of the Liberal Party.

At the federal level, Warrnambool is the largest town in the division of Wannon, which has been a safe Liberal seat since 1955. However, Warrnambool booths typically receive a much stronger Labor vote than the rural areas that surround it. The seat was held by former Prime Minister Malcolm Fraser for 28 years, before being held by former Speaker of the lower house David Hawker for 27 years.

Education

Primary
There are many primary schools in Warrnambool, including:
Warrnambool Primary School
Warrnambool East Primary School
Warrnambool West Primary School
 Merrivale Primary School
 Allansford and District Primary School
 Woodford Primary School
 Our Lady Help of Christians Primary School (Catholic)
 St Joseph's Primary School (Catholic)
 St Pius X Primary School (Catholic)
 St John's Primary School, Dennington (Catholic)
 Kings College (primary and secondary)
 Merri River School (formally Warrnambool Special Development School) (primary and secondary)

Secondary
Warrnambool has two public high schools:

 Brauer College
Warrnambool College

In addition, there is:

 Emmanuel College, a Catholic school
 King's College, a private Presbyterian school

Tertiary
The city's only university facilities are at the Deakin University Warrnambool campus. The South West Institute of TAFE and SEAL both provide vocational education.

Environment 

Logan's Beach on the eastern side of the city is recognised as a nursery site for the southern right whale Eubalaena australis, and many tourists have been attracted to opportunities for land-based observations. Most years one, two or three adult female whales arrive between late May and August, giving birth within days of their arrival. The young whale calf is then reared at the site, usually departing with its parent by mid to late September. Besides the southern right whale, the coastline is also visited by Australian fur seals, little penguins and common dolphins. During the winter and early spring albatross cruise along the coastline and can be sighted from Thunder Point, a popular coastal lookout in the town.

Middle Island has a colony of little penguins (Eudyptula minor). Fox predation reduced numbers significantly. In 2005 only four penguins were remaining in the colony. Warrnambool City Council introduced a world first program using Maremma dogs to guard the penguins. This program has supported the re-establishment of a colony of over one-hundred penguins in 2009. By 2015 the population had reached almost two-hundred. The film Oddball tells the story of the dogs saving the penguins.

Transport

Warrnambool is situated on the Princes Highway between Port Fairy to the west and Terang to the east as well as at the south-western terminus of the Hopkins Highway. The Great Ocean Road terminates 13 km east of Warrnambool, near Allansford.

Rail services operate to Melbourne and Geelong. V/Line passenger train services call at Warrnambool's two stations, Warrnambool in the city and Sherwood Park in the city's outer east, seven days a week. A daily container freight service is being run by Pacific National for local container handler Westvic.

Local buses under the Transit South West brand cover Warrnambool's city and suburbs and extend to the nearby towns of Port Fairy and Koroit. V/Line coaches connect Warrnambool with Mount Gambier, Ballarat, Ararat, Casterton and the Great Ocean Road to Geelong.

Health
There are two main hospitals in Warrnambool:

Warrnambool Base Hospital, run by South West Healthcare, founded in 1854 as Warrnambool Hospital & Benevolent Asylum, with further name changes and mergers over the years, including a name change to Warrnambool and District Base Hospital in 1925 and Stage 1 of a  redevelopment opened in 2011 as Warrnambool Base Hospital.

St John of God Warrnambool Hospital, a private hospital established in  1939 by the Sisters of St John of God and run by St John of God Health Care

Notable people
 Airbourne, hard rock band
 Tom Ballard (b. 1989), comedian
 Ben Barber (b. 1984), actor 
 Smoky Dawson (1913–2008), country music performer (born in Collingwood, raised in Warrnambool)
 Alex Dyson (b. 1988), radio presenter
 Sir John Eccles (1903–1997), Nobel Prize winner in physiology or medicine, 1963
 Brian Fitzpatrick (1905–1965), Australian economic historian
 Danielle Green, Member of Victorian Parliament was raised and educated in Warrnambool
 Dave Hughes (b. 1970), comedian
 Paul Jennings (b. 1943), children's author – (resides in Warrnambool)
 Sally Walker, Law Professor, Vice-Chancellor and President of Deakin University
 Axle Whitehead (b. 1980), musician and TV personality

Sportspeople
 Jonathan Brown (b. 1981), Leon Cameron (b. 1972), Paul Couch (1964–2016), Simon Hogan (b. 1988), Jordan Lewis (b. 1986), Brent Moloney (b. 1984), Noel Mugavin (b. 1956), Kevin Neale (b. 1945), Matt Maguire (b. 1984), Billie Smedts (b. 1992), Wayne Schwass (b. 1968), Michael Turner (b. 1954), Sam Dwyer (b. 1986), Martin Gleeson (b. 1994), John Burns (b. 1949) Australian rules football players
 Marc Leishman (b. 1983), golfer
 Christian Ryan (b. 1977), Olympic Silver Medallist, rowing 2000
 Nathan Sobey (b. 1990), basketball player
 Tim Ludeman, cricket player

Sister cities

 Miura, Kanagawa, Japan
 Changchun, Jilin Province, P.R.China
 Knoxville, Iowa, United States of America

See also
 ABC South West Victoria
 Mahogany Ship
 Warrnambool Airport
 Warrnambool V/Line rail service

References

External links 

 Warrnambool City Council official website
 Warrnambool Tourism Association official website
 
 Warrnambool – Official state tourism website.

Towns in Victoria (Australia)
City of Warrnambool
Cities in Victoria (Australia)
Coastal cities in Australia
Port cities in Victoria (Australia)